Wellington Shire could refer to either of two local government areas in Australia:

 Shire of Wellington in Victoria
 Wellington Council in New South Wales